"This Is Where I Came In" is the final single released by musical group the Bee Gees, released as the only single from their last album, This Is Where I Came In (2001), on 26 March 2001. The song was written by Barry, Robin and Maurice Gibb. Lead vocals are performed by Robin Gibb on the first verse and on the chorus, while Barry Gibb sang lead on the second verse and sing harmony on the chorus.

The song reached  18 on the UK Singles Chart, becoming their final top-40 hit in the United Kingdom. With this track, the Bee Gees became the first group to obtain UK top-20 hits across five decades, which began in 1967 with "New York Mining Disaster 1941". It also reached No. 25 in Germany and No. 23 on the US Billboard Adult Contemporary chart. The song's music video was described as "very stylish and beautiful."

Track listings

Charts

Release history

References

2001 singles
2001 songs
Bee Gees songs
Music videos directed by Jake Nava
Polydor Records singles
Song recordings produced by Barry Gibb
Song recordings produced by Maurice Gibb
Song recordings produced by Robin Gibb
Songs written by Barry Gibb
Songs written by Maurice Gibb
Songs written by Robin Gibb